The symbols Δt and ΔT (spoken as "delta T") are commonly used in a variety of contexts.

Time
 ΔT (timekeeping) the difference between two time scales, Universal Time and Terrestrial Time, which results from a drift in the length of a day
 The interval of time used in determining velocity
 The increment between successive nerve impulses

Temperature
 to mean a difference in temperature including thermodynamic temperature, may occur in
 Discussions of climate change
 Discussions of heat transfer
 Discussions of the effects of thermal gradients

See also 
 Delta time (disambiguation)
 Finite difference for the mathematics of the Δ operator
 Delta (letter) for the Greek letter Δ
 ∂ for the mathematical symbol used in the notation "∂T"